Vision City is a residential high-rise development located in the Tsuen Wan district of the New Territories in Hong Kong, China. The complex consists of five towers, each of which ranks among the tallest buildings in the city. The tallest buildings in the complex are Vision City 2 and Vision City 3, which both rise  and 52 floors. The towers are tied as the 67th-tallest buildings in Hong Kong. Towers 1 and 5 rise  and 52 floors, standing as the 70th-tallest buildings in the city. The entire complex was completed in 2007. The five towers, composed entirely of residential units, rise out of a common podium that is used for retail space.

Demographics
According to the 2016 by-census, Vision City had a population of 4,472. The median age was 40.6 and the majority of residents (90.6 per cent) were of Chinese ethnicity. The average household size was 3.2 people. The median monthly household income of all households (i.e. including both economically active and inactive households) was HK$60,650.

Politics
Vision City is located in Tsuen Wan South constituency of the Tsuen Wan District Council. It is currently represented by Antonio Luk Ling-chung, who was elected in the 2019 elections.

See also
List of tallest buildings in Hong Kong

Others 
 Citywalk, Hong Kong, a shopping centre located beneath Vision City

References

External links 

Tower's Website

Sino Group
Residential buildings completed in 2007
Residential skyscrapers in Hong Kong
2007 establishments in Hong Kong